Converse County School District #2 is a public school district based in Glenrock, Wyoming, United States.  The district's team colors are made up of purple and white, and a bighorn sheep represents their mascot.

Geography
Converse County School District #2 serves the western portion of Converse County, including the following communities:

Incorporated places
Town of Glenrock
Town of Rolling Hills

Schools
Glenrock Junior/Senior High School (Grades 7–12)
Glenrock Intermediate School (Grades 4–6)
Grant Elementary School (Grades PK–3)

Student demographics
The following figures are as of October 1, 2009.

Total district employees: 1,288
Student enrollment by gender
Male: 369 (53.63%)
Female: 319 (46.37%)
Student enrollment by ethnicity
American Indian or Alaska Native: 3 (0.44%)
Black or African American: 4 (0.58%)
Hispanic or Latino: 51 (7.41%)
Two or More Races: 12 (1.74%)
White: 618 (89.83%)

Football field 
In 2014, the high school football field was upgraded to fake turf. The project cost around $800,000 dollars, with about $500,000 dollars from the Wyoming Schools Facility Department. The style is the "Field Turf Revolution Model", which is also used by nearby Casper Schools.

Shootout incident 
On March 22, 2018, Grant Elementary and the High School went into lock-down, and the Middle School was placed on high alert, due to a shootout around the time students were supposed to leave, just happening down the street of the high school. The lock-down went into effect around 2:10 pm. The house where the shootout was happening started on fire and eventually, they suspect was taken into custody. At about 4:40 pm, the lock-down was lifted and the kids could go home.

See also
List of school districts in Wyoming

References

External links

Education in Converse County, Wyoming
School districts in Wyoming